The Manager of Opposition Business in the House, sometimes called Opposition Leader of the House, is the member of the Australian Official Opposition Shadow Ministry responsible for negotiating with the Leader of the House regarding proceedings in the Australian House of Representatives. Among other things, the topics of negotiation are the order in which Government bills and other items of business are taken, the time allotted for debate, and the timing of Opposition business.

The Manager of Opposition Business in the House and the Deputy Manager are appointed by the Opposition leader. The current Manager of Opposition Business in the House is Paul Fletcher and his deputy is Kevin Hogan. The duties of the Deputy Manager of Opposition Business are largely contingent, coming into play only when the Manager of Opposition Business is absent from the House or is on leave, when he or she is referred to as Acting Manager of Opposition Business.

Three managers of Opposition Business in the House, John Howard, Julia Gillard, and Anthony Albanese, went on to become Prime Ministers.

Another future Prime Minister, Tony Abbott stepped in as Acting Manager in 2009 in the absence of Christopher Pyne.

List
The Managers of Opposition Business since 1974 are as follows:

See also
 Leader of the House (Australia)
 Manager of Opposition Business in the Senate
 Manager of Government Business in the Senate

References

Lists of political office-holders in Australia
Politics of Australia
Opposition of Australia